Stampede is the fifth studio album by American rock band the Doobie Brothers. The album was released on April 25, 1975, by Warner Bros. Records. It was the final album by the band before Michael McDonald replaced Tom Johnston as lead vocalist and primary songwriter. The album has been certified gold by the RIAA.

Recording and content
Stampede showed the band diversifying elements of their sound more than ever before, combining elements of their old sound as well as country-rock, funk and folk music. Many guest musicians contributed on the album including Maria Muldaur, Ry Cooder and Curtis Mayfield.

This was the first album featuring Jeff "Skunk" Baxter as a full-fledged member of the band, although he is absent from the cover photo.  He had previously played on a couple of songs as a guest on the two previous albums and toured with the band prior to this one.

The first and most successful single released from this album was "Take Me in Your Arms (Rock Me)" on April 23, 1975, a classic Motown tune written by the legendary songwriting trio of Holland-Dozier-Holland. Tom Johnston had wanted to record the song for several years. "I thought that would be a killer track to cover," he said. "It's probably one of my favorite songs of all time. I thought our version came out great."

The next single, released on July 8, 1975, was "Sweet Maxine" which was more akin to the Doobie Brothers' earlier hits style-wise. "Pat wrote the music to this and I wrote the words," Johnston recalled. "And Billy Payne had a lot to do with the sound of the song, because of his incredible keyboard playing." The track stalled at #40 on the Billboard charts. Record World said that "after a barrelhouse piano intro, the boys zoom back into that familiar rockin' groove."

The third and final single was Patrick Simmons' "I Cheat the Hangman", released November 12, 1975. It is a somber outlaw ballad that was inspired by the story An Occurrence at Owl Creek Bridge by Ambrose Bierce. "It's about a ghost returning to his home after the Civil War and not realizing he's dead," said Simmons about the song. The album version of the song is a progressive rock-style composition ending in a twisted collage of strings, horns and synthesizers made to sound like ghostly wails. "We'd cut the track, and we kicked around how to develop the ending—I thought about synthesizers and guitar solos. Ted [Templeman] got to thinking about it, and he ran it past [arranger] Nick DeCaro for some orchestration ideas. 'Night on Bald Mountain' by Mussorgsky really inspired the wildness of the strings, and Nick came up with the chorale thing at the end." The ambitious "I Cheat the Hangman" only managed to reach #60 on the music charts.  Cash Box said it was a "rather lengthy piece quite unlike any previous single release from this super-group" and "a low-key ballad carried by a single, melodic voice against flowing guitar picking that grows into beautiful vocal harmony from the group, soon to segue into sustained orchestration holding a sweeping power chord under which some jazz improvisation goes on."  Record World said that "the Doobies stretch out with a searing ballad that relies on a strong vocal harmony sound."

"Neal's Fandango" was inspired by the Santa Cruz mountains and was an homage to Neal Cassady, Merry Prankster bus driver and former Jack Kerouac sidekick in On the Road. It was occasionally played on San Francisco Bay Area classic rock station KFOX "K-FOX" (that means KUFX) because of the Doobie Brothers' South Bay roots.

Track listing

Personnel
The Doobie Brothers
Tom Johnston – guitars, lead and backing vocals
Patrick Simmons – guitars, lead and backing vocals
Jeff "Skunk" Baxter – guitars, pedal steel guitar
Tiran Porter – bass guitar, backing vocals
John Hartman – drums, percussion
Keith Knudsen – drums, percussion, backing vocals, co-lead vocals on "Double Dealin' Four Flusher"

Additional musicians
Bill Payne – piano on "Sweet Maxine", "Neal's Fandango", "Texas Lullaby", "Take Me in Your Arms", "I Cheat the Hangman" and "Double Dealin' Four Flusher", organ on "Music Man" and "I Been Workin' on You", electric piano on "Double Dealin' Four Flusher", other keyboards
Ry Cooder – bottleneck guitar on "Rainy Day Crossroad Blues"
Karl Himmel – drums and percussion on "I Been Workin' on You"
Bobbye Hall Porter – congas on "Take Me in Your Arms"
Victor Feldman – marimba, percussion
Conte Candoli, Pete Candoli – trumpets on "I Cheat the Hangman"
Harry Bluestone – concertmaster on "Rainy Day Crossroad Blues"
Maria Muldaur – backing vocals on "I Cheat the Hangman"
Sherlie Matthews, Venetta Fields and Jessica Smith – backing vocals on "Take Me in Your Arms" and "I Been Workin' on You"
Nick DeCaro – string arrangements on "Texas Lullaby", "I Cheat the Hangman" and "Rainy Day Crossroad Blues"
Paul Riser – string and horn arrangements on "Take Me in Your Arms", horn arrangements on "Sweet Maxine" and "Double Dealin' Four Flusher"
Curtis Mayfield – string and horn arrangements on "Music Man"
Richard Tufo – orchestration on "Music Man"

Production
Ted Templeman – producer, additional percussion
Donn Landee, Travis Turk – engineers
Barbara Casado, John Casado – design
Jill Maggid, Michael Maggid – photography
Ed Thrasher – art direction

Charts

Certifications

Notes

References

1975 albums
The Doobie Brothers albums
Albums arranged by Paul Riser
Albums produced by Ted Templeman
Warner Records albums